The Titchmarsh convolution theorem describes the properties of the support of the convolution of two functions. It was proven by Edward Charles Titchmarsh in 1926.

Titchmarsh convolution theorem 

	
The theorem can be restated in the following form:

Let . Then  if the left-hand side is finite. Similarly,  if the right-hand side is finite.

This theorem essentially states that the well-known inclusion  is sharp at the boundary.

The higher-dimensional generalization in terms of the convex hull of the supports was proven by Jacques-Louis Lions in 1951:

If , then 

Above,  denotes the convex hull of the set and  denotes the space of distributions with compact support.

The original proof by Titchmarsh uses complex-variable techniques, and is based on the Phragmén–Lindelöf principle, Jensen's inequality, Carleman's theorem, and Valiron's theorem. The theorem has since been proven several more times, typically using either real-variable or complex-variable methods. Gian-Carlo Rota has stated that no proof yet addresses the theorem's underlying combinatorial structure, which he believes is necessary for complete understanding.

References

Theorems in harmonic analysis
Theorems in complex analysis
Theorems in real analysis